Ratnovskaya is a rural locality (a village) in Razinskoye Rural Settlement, Kharovsky District, Vologda Oblast, Russia. The population was 42 in 2002.

Geography 
Ratnovskaya is located 44 km north of Kharovsk (the district's administrative centre) by road. Nikulinskoye is the nearest rural locality.

References 

Rural localities in Kharovsky District